Muqaddama Ashrafi (June 5, 1936 – June 29, 2013) was a Tajikistani medievalist and art historian.

Biography 
Ashrafi was born in Tashkent into an ethnic Tajik family. Her father was the noted composer Mukhtar Ashrafi. She graduated from the Taskhent Musical School in 1954; in 1959 she received a degree in art history from the Moscow State University. From that year until 1961 she worked in the Oriental Studies Department of the USSR Academy of Sciences in Moscow; beginning in 1962 she was a postgraduate student at that institution's Institute of Oriental Studies, graduating in 1968. From 1969 until 1971 she was employed at the Tajik Academy of Sciences in the Department of Philosophy; in 1972 she moved to the organization's Institute of History. That same year saw the beginning of her chairmanship of the humanities department at the Tajik Technological University. As a scholar, Ashrafi took as her specialties the medieval arts, especially painting, of Central Asia. She was married to the writer Kamol Ayni. At the time of her death she was at work on the last volume of a planned trilogy on the subject of Tajik miniature painting, having already published the first two volumes in 2011.

References

1936 births
2013 deaths
20th-century Tajikistani historians
21st-century Tajikistani historians
Ethnic Tajik people
Members of the Tajik Academy of Sciences
Historians of Central Asia
Moscow State University alumni
Writers from Tashkent
Tajikistani medievalists
20th-century Tajikistani women writers
21st-century Tajikistani women writers
Women medievalists
Women art historians